Peter Šišovský (born August 15, 1991) is a Slovak professional ice hockey player who currently playing professionally for HC Nové Zámky of the Slovak Extraliga.

He has previously played for HC 07 Detva, HK Martin, HK Dukla Trenčín, ŠHK 37 Piešťany, HKM Zvolen and HC Vítkovice Ridera.

Career statistics

Regular season and playoffs

International

References

External links

1991 births
Living people
People from Dubnica nad Váhom
Sportspeople from the Trenčín Region
Slovak ice hockey right wingers
HC 07 Detva players
HK Dukla Trenčín players
MHC Martin players
ŠHK 37 Piešťany players
HC Prešov players
HKM Zvolen players
HC Vítkovice players
HC Slovan Bratislava players
HK Poprad players
HC Nové Zámky players
Slovak expatriate ice hockey players in the Czech Republic